Beraketa is a town and commune in Madagascar. It belongs to the district of Bekily, which is a part of Androy Region.

It is situated at the Route nationale 13, Ihosy to Tolagnaro.

The population of the commune was estimated to be approximately 14,000 in 2001 commune census.

Beraketa is served by a local airport. Primary and junior level secondary education are available in town. It is also a site of industrial-scale  mining.

The majority (80%) of the population of the commune are farmers. The most important crop is rice, while other important products are peanuts and cassava. Industry and services provide employment for 1% and 19% of the population, respectively.

References and notes 

Populated places in Androy